The Desert Bride is a 1928 American silent drama film directed by Walter Lang and starring Betty Compson and Allan Forrest. The film is considered to be lost.

Plot
In North Africa a French intelligence officer and his fiancée are taken prisoner by Arab Nationalists, whose leader tortures them before they are rescued by French troops.

Cast
 Betty Compson as Diane Duval
 Allan Forrest as Capt. Maurice de Florimont
 Edward Martindel as Col. Sorelle
 Otto Matieson as Kassim Ben Ali
 Roscoe Karns as Pvt. Terry
 Frank Austin as Beggar

References

Bibliography
 Parish, James & Robert & Pitts, Michael R. The Great Spy Pictures. Scarecrow Press, 1974.

External links
 
 

1928 films
1928 drama films
Silent American drama films
American silent feature films
American black-and-white films
1920s English-language films
Films directed by Walter Lang
Lost American films
Columbia Pictures films
1928 lost films
Lost drama films
1920s American films